Cass County is a county in the U.S. state of Nebraska. As of the 2010 United States Census, the population was 25,241. Its county seat and largest city is Plattsmouth. The county was formed in 1855, and was named for General Lewis Cass.

Cass County is included in the Omaha-Council Bluffs, NE-IA Metropolitan Statistical Area.

In the Nebraska license plate system, Cass County is represented by the prefix 20 (it had the 20th-largest number of vehicles registered in the county when the license plate system was established in 1922).

Geography
Cass County lies on the east side of Nebraska. Its east boundary line abuts the west boundary line of the state of Iowa, across the Missouri River.

Major highways

  Interstate 80
  U.S. Highway 6
  U.S. Highway 34
  U.S. Highway 75
  Nebraska Highway 1
  Nebraska Highway 43
  Nebraska Highway 50
  Nebraska Highway 63
  Nebraska Highway 66
  Nebraska Highway 67

Protected areas

 Beaver Lake
 Louisville State Recreation Area
 Eugene T. Mahoney State Park
 Platte River State Park
 Schilling Wildlife Management Area

Adjacent counties

 Sarpy County - north
 Mills County, Iowa - northeast
 Fremont County, Iowa - southeast
 Otoe County - south
 Lancaster County - west
 Saunders County - northwest

Due to its proximity to Cass County, Iowa, and because both of those counties receive most of their broadcasts from Omaha, Nebraska, references to 'Cass County' must be frequently disambiguated, or result in confusion.

Demographics

As of the 2020 United States Census, there were 26,598 people and 10,073 households. The population density was 48.5 people per square mile (22/km2). There were 11,761 housing units at an average density of 21 per square mile (8.5/km2). The racial makeup of the county was 92.8% White, 0.8% Black or Black or African American, 0.7% Native American, 0.6% Asian, 0.1% Native Hawaiian and Pacific Islander, and 1.9% from two or more races.  3.8% of the population were Hispanic or Latino of any race.

As of the 2010 United States Census, there were 25,241 people, 9,698 households and 7,078 families. The population density was 45 people per square mile (17/km2). There were 11,117 housing units at an average density of 20 per square mile (7.7/km2). The racial makeup of the county was 89.3% White, 0.7% Black or Black or African American, 1.0% Native American, 0.6% Asian, 0.1% Native Hawaiian and Pacific Islander, 0.6%  other races, and 1.5% from two or more races.  2.4% of the population were Hispanic or Latino of any race.

As of the 2000 United States Census, there were 24,334 people, 9,161 households, and 6,806 families in the county. The population density was 44 people per square mile (17/km2). There were 10,179 housing units at an average density of 18 per square mile (7/km2). The racial makeup of the county was 97.89% White, 0.18% Black or African American, 0.30% Native American, 0.35% Asian, 0.02% Pacific Islander, 0.35% from other races, and 0.92% from two or more races. 1.46% of the population were Hispanic or Latino of any race. 39.4% were of German, 9.6% American, 8.8% Irish and 7.9% English ancestry.

There were 9,161 households, out of which 35.80% had children under the age of 18 living with them, 63.30% were married couples living together, 7.60% had a female householder with no husband present, and 25.70% were non-families. 21.60% of all households were made up of individuals, and 9.40% had someone living alone who was 65 years of age or older. The average household size was 2.63 and the average family size was 3.07.

The county population contained 27.90% under the age of 18, 7.00% from 18 to 24, 29.00% from 25 to 44, 23.80% from 45 to 64, and 12.30% who were 65 years of age or older. The median age was 37 years. For every 100 females there were 97.70 males. For every 100 females age 18 and over, there were 95.00 males.

The median income for a household in the county was $46,515, and the median income for a family was $52,196. Males had a median income of $36,639 versus $24,612 for females. The per capita income for the county was $20,156.  About 4.20% of families and 5.20% of the population were below the poverty line, including 7.10% of those under age 18 and 4.50% of those age 65 or over.

Communities

Cities
 Louisville
 Plattsmouth (county seat)
 Weeping Water

Villages

 Alvo
 Avoca
 Cedar Creek
 Eagle
 Elmwood
 Greenwood
 Manley
 Murdock
 Murray
 Nehawka
 South Bend
 Union

Unincorporated communities

 Cullom
Factoryville
Mynard
Rock Bluff
Wabash

Census divisions
Cass County is divided into the following divisions, called precincts, except for the cities of Plattsmouth and Weeping Water.

Avoca
Center
East Rock Bluff
Eight Mile Grove
Elmwood
Greenwood
Liberty
City of Louisville
Mount Pleasant
Nehawka
City of Plattsmouth
Plattsmouth
Salt Creek
South Bend
Stove Creek
Tipton
Weeping Water (City)
Weeping Water
West Rock Bluff

Politics
Cass County voters are overwhelmingly Republican. In only one national election since 1936 has the county given a majority to the Democratic Party candidate, that being 1964 which Lyndon B. Johnson won in a landslide nationally.

See also
 Naomi Institute
National Register of Historic Places listings in Cass County, Nebraska
Eugene T. Mahoney State Park

References

 
Nebraska counties on the Missouri River
1855 establishments in Nebraska Territory